Horatio is an English male given name, an Italianized form of the ancient Roman Latin nomen (name) Horatius, from the Roman gens (clan) Horatia. The modern Italian form is Orazio, the modern Spanish form Horacio. It appears to have been first used in England in 1565, in the Tudor era during which the Italian Renaissance movement had started to influence English culture. The name Horace is another related name from the same Latin source.

History 

Prominent English-language examples of the name "Horatio" include:
Horatio de Vere, 1st Baron Vere of Tilbury (1565–1635), an English military leader, was one of the earliest English holders of the name, born 34 years before Shakespeare invented the character Horatio in his  1599/1601 play Hamlet. He was a grandfather of Horatio Townshend, 1st Viscount Townshend (1630–1687), whose son Charles Townshend, 2nd Viscount Townshend (a ward of Col. Robert Walpole (1650–1700) of Houghton Hall in Norfolk) married Dorothy Walpole, one of the latter's daughters and a sister of Horatio Walpole, 1st Baron Walpole (1678–1757) (and of Robert Walpole, 1st Earl of Orford (1676–1745), the Prime Minister). The name Horatio was subsequently much used by the Walpole family and by the 1st Baron Walpole's illustrious younger cousin Admiral Horatio Nelson (1758–1805), his father's great-great grandson, born one year after 1st Baron Walpole's death. The 1st Baron Walpole's son, Horatio Walpole, 1st Earl of Orford, 2nd Baron Walpole (1723–1809) served as a godfather at the christening of Admiral Horatio Nelson in 1758, who for that reason, as was common, was given his name. The Admiral died without issue, but his great-nephew Horatio Nelson, 3rd Earl Nelson (1823–1913) (born with the surname "Bolton", eventual heir and great-nephew of the Admiral's elder brother William Nelson, 1st Earl Nelson, heir of the Admiral) carried on the name.

People

Born 16th century 

 Horatio Vere, 1st Baron Vere of Tilbury (1565–1635) (also Horace Vere or Horatio de Vere), an English military leader. Grandfather of Horatio Townshend, 1st Viscount Townshend (1630–1687).

Born 17th century 

 Horatio Townshend, 1st Viscount Townshend (1630–1687), English politician
 Horatio Walpole, 1st Baron Walpole (1678–1757), English diplomat

Born 18th century 

 Horatio Walpole, 4th Earl of Orford (1717–1797), commonly known as Horace Walpole, English author, art historian, antiquarian and politician
 Horatio Sharpe (1718–1790), 22nd Proprietary Governor of Maryland
 Horatio Walpole, 1st Earl of Orford (1723–1809), British politician, son of the 1st baron Walpole
 Horatio Gates (c. 1727–1806), American general
 Horatio Mann (1744–1814), English politician
 Horatio Walpole, 2nd Earl of Orford (1752–1822), English politician, son of the 1st earl
 Horatio Nelson, 1st Viscount Nelson (1758–1805), British admiral
 Horatio Seymour (Vermont politician) (1778–1857), United States senator from Vermont
 Horatio Walpole, 3rd Earl of Orford (1783–1858), British politician, son of the 2nd earl
 Horatio Chriesman (1797–1878) American surveyor, mayor in Mexican Texas and participant in the Texas Revolution.

Born 19th century 

 Horatio Thomas Austin (1801–1865), British Royal Navy officer and arctic explorer
 Horatio Ross (1801–1886), Scottish sportsman and pioneering amateur photographer
 Horatio Allen (1802–1889), American civil engineer and inventor
 Horatio Potter (1802–1887), Episcopal bishop in the Diocese of New York
 Horatio Greenough (1805–1852), American sculptor
 Horatio Bridge (1806–1893), American naval commodore
 Horatio McCulloch (1806–1867), Scottish landscape painter
 Horatio Seymour (1810–1886), American politician, 18th governor of New York
 Horatio King (1811–1897), American politician, Postmaster General of the United States
 Horatio Wills (1811–1861), Australian pastoralist and politician
 Horatio Walpole, 4th Earl of Orford (second creation) (1813–1894), British politician, son of the 3rd earl
 Horatio Hale (1817–1896), American-Canadian ethnologist, philologist and businessman
 Horatio Wright (1820–1899), American engineer and American Civil War Union Army General
 Horatio Spafford (1828–1888), lawyer, hymn writer
 Horatio Alger, Jr. (1832–1899), American author
 Horatio Davies (1842–1912), London businessman, politician and magistrate
 Horatio Frederick Phillips (1845–1924), early aviation pioneer from the United Kingdom
 Horatio J. Homer (1848–1923), Boston's first African-American police officer
 Horatio Herbert Kitchener, 1st Earl Kitchener (1850–1916), British field marshal
 Horatio Brown (1854–1926), Scottish historian
 Horatio Earle (1855–1935), American road advocate
 Horatio Hocken (1857–1937), Canadian politician, social reformer and a founder of what became the Toronto Star newspaper
 Horatio Walker (1858–1938), Canadian painter
 Horatio Bottomley (1860–1932), English swindler, publisher and politician
 Horatio Torromé (1861–1920), British/Argentinian figure skater
 Horatio Caro (1862–1920), English chess player
 Horatio Parker (1863–1919), American composer
 Horatio Dresser (1866–1945), New Thought religious leader and author
 Horatio Nelson Jackson (1872–1955), American automobile pioneer and physician
 Horatio Barber (1875–1964), early British aviation pioneer

Born 20th century 

 Horatio Luro (1901–1991), American thoroughbred horse racing trainer
 Horatio Clare (born 1973), British author
 Horatio Sanz (born 1974), Chilean-born American comedian

Fictional characters 

 Cap'n Turbot, a main character in the TV show PAW Patrol, whose first name is "Horatio"
 Admiral Lord Horatio D'Ascoyne, character played by Alec Guinness in the movie Kind Hearts and Coronets
 Horatio 2.0, a robotic tarsier in the TV series The Nutshack
 Horatio Blass, character in novel, No Fixed Address
 Horatio Caine, police lieutenant in the television series CSI: Miami
 Horatio (Hamlet), a character in the play Hamlet (1599/1601) by William Shakespeare
 Horatio Hellpop, character in the comic book series Nexus
 Horatio Hornblower, naval hero in the novels of C. S. Forester
 Horatio Magellan Crunch, the mascot of Cap'n Crunch cereal
 Horatio Peter McCallister, a fictional character from the animated sitcom The Simpsons
 Horatio the Elephant, muppet on Sesame Street
 Horatio, a character in Watch Dogs 2
 Horatio, the founder of the Horatio faction in the strategy game Endless Space
 Horatio, the protagonist in Pit People

See also 

 Horatius (disambiguation)
 Horace (given name)
 Horacio

References 

Masculine given names
Latin given names
English masculine given names